Carlos J. Peinado Stagnero (born 23 December 1954) is a retired Uruguayan professional basketball player. He represented his native country at the 1984 Summer Olympics in Los Angeles, California, where the Uruguay national basketball team ended up in sixth place in the final rankings. Peinado was the oldest member (29 years, 219 days) of the Uruguayan Olympic Squad, and was the flag bearer at the opening ceremony.

External links

 Interview to Carlos Peinado 
 Biography of Carlos Peinado 

1954 births
Living people
Uruguayan men's basketball players
1982 FIBA World Championship players
Basketball players at the 1984 Summer Olympics
Olympic basketball players of Uruguay
Pan American Games competitors for Uruguay
Basketball players at the 1987 Pan American Games